Ezz od Din (also Romanized as ‘Ezz od Dīn, ‘Azzaddīn, and ‘Azz od Dīn) is a village in Bazarjan Rural District, in the Central District of Tafresh County, Markazi Province, Iran. At the 2006 census, its population was 192, in 65 families.

References 

Populated places in Tafresh County